The 2008–09 Longwood Lancers men's basketball team represented Longwood University during the 2008–09 NCAA Division I men's basketball season. The team was led by sixth-year head coach Mike Gillian, and played their home games at Willett Hall as a Division I independent school.

Last season
The Lancers had a record of 9–22 in their first season as a full member of Division I.

Roster

Schedule 

|-
!colspan=9 style="background:#002B7F; color:#AFAAA3;"| Regular season

References

Longwood Lancers men's basketball seasons
Longwood
Longwood Lancers men's basketball
Long